Tai Wo Hau is an MTR station between  and  stations on the . It serves the areas of Kwai Yin Court and Tai Wo Hau Estate in the Kwai Tsing District, and some resited villages (such as Kwan Mun Hau Tsuen) in the Tsuen Wan District of Hong Kong. These villages were originally in Tsuen Wan town centre, being moved for new town development.

Tai Wo Hau station was one of the first railway stations in the New Territories; and the first underground one. All other New Territories stations on the Tsuen Wan line are either at surface level or on viaducts. Lai King station cuts through a hillside slope, and all other New Territories underground stations were opened some years later.

The station is relatively less busy in the system because of its distance to nearby bus stops and settlements.

History

The station was built on the site of a park. The 280-metre-long, 22-metre-wide, 15-metre-deep station box was built bottom-up within a sheetpile cofferdam. The tunnel between Tai Wo Hau and Kwai Hing stations was completed in July 1980 using the drill-and-blast method. Tai Wo Hau station opened on 10 May 1982, in sync with Tsuen Wan line. In 1984, the New Territories Development Department awarded a contract for the construction of a park above the station to replace the one which originally existed there. This park is now called Kwok Shui Road Park.

Station layout
Platforms 1 and 2 share the same island platform.

Entrances/exits
 A: Hoi Pa San Tsuen, Ham Tin Tsuen, Ho Pui Tsuen, Kwok Shui Road, Primrose Hill
 B: Castle Peak Road, Kwai Yin Court, Kwai Chung Estate, Tai Wo Hau Estate

References

MTR stations in the New Territories
Tsuen Wan line
Tsuen Wan District
Railway stations in Hong Kong opened in 1982
1982 establishments in Hong Kong